The Kriegsmarine was the navy of Nazi Germany prior to and during World War II. Kriegsmarine uniform design followed that of the preexisting Reichsmarine, itself based on that of the First World War Kaiserliche Marine. Kriegsmarine styles of uniform and insignia had many features in common with those of other European navies, all derived from the British Royal Navy of the 19th century, such as officers' frock coats, sleeve braid, and the "sailor suit" uniform for enlisted personnel and petty officers.

Basic structure

The basic structure of Kriegsmarine uniforms and insignia was divided into 5 categories of personnel:
Matrosen (Mannschaften, comparable OR-1 to OR-4, NATO) = Seamen enlisted personnel, usually serving for a short term of enlistment
Maate (Unteroffiziere ohne Portepee, OR-5a/b) = Technical specialist, the equivalent of a Petty Officer
Feldwebel (Portepeeunteroffiziere, also Unteroffiziere mit Portepee, OR-6 to OR-8) = having a position between Petty Officer and Warrant Officer
Seeoffiziere (OF-1 to OF-5) = Naval Officers 
Admiralität, also Admiräle = (OF-6 to OF-10): Flag Officers

Naval officers wore blue colored uniforms with rank displayed by both sleeve stripes and epaulets. Regular line officers (Seeoffiziere) wore sleeve stripes beneath a gold star. Staff officers displayed a unique sleeve emblem in place of the star and also wore this insignia centered on their shoulder epaulets. When writing their rank in correspondence, staff officers would include a staff designator such as Kapitänleutnant (Ing.) to indicate their career field. Specialty officers, which included all administrative career fields, wore silver coat buttons instead of gold. A further classification for officers was that of Sonderführer. These officers were either technical or administrative specialists, in highly specific career fields, who wore the uniforms and insignia of line officers. One of the more recognizable special fields was that of Marinekriegsberichter (Naval war correspondent) whose members were dispatched with various naval ships and submarines in order to report on naval life and victories during the war. One such correspondent, Lothar-Günther Buchheim, later published a novel based on his war experiences which was then made into the submarine action film Das Boot.

Seaman displayed rank through the use of sleeve chevrons and badges. Enlisted sailors, who wore no insignia, were known by the generic term Matrose and used a rating system similar to other European navies of the day. Rating badges in the form of a small patch were worn on the upper left sleeve and indicated the particular specialty of the sailor in question. The enlistment system of the Kriegsmarine was designed to differentiate between those sailors wishing to make the navy a career and those simply completing a standard tour of enlistment. Those who were drafted, or who had no aspirations to become Petty Officers, could advance to become Matrosengefreiter (literally "Seaman Corporals"). Special grades existed for those sailors with six and eight years of service, denoted by embroidered sleeve chevrons. A further classification for Seaman was that of Unteroffizier Aspirant. Such seaman were recognized as in training to become Petty officers and wore a silver grey bar beneath their sleeve chevron while in training and a "nested" chevron bar once training was complete. All seaman in petty officer training were denoted in correspondence as "(UA)" after their name and standard rank.

Petty officers in the Kriegsmarine were known by the title Maat. Once advanced to the grade of petty officer, sailors were addressed, both verbally and in correspondence, by their rate followed by the term Maat. For instance, a boatswain petty officer would be referred to as Bootsmannmaat while a leading torpedoman petty officer would be known as Mechanikerobermaat. Petty officers wore special collar patches to denote their rank and a large rating badge on their left shoulder. On service coats and frocks, regular sailors wore a simple blue collar tab to differentiate between the petty officers.

Feldwebel (PO1 to CWO) wore shoulder boards on all uniforms as their primary means of rank with a rating symbol centered on the shoulder strap. Unteroffiziere mit Portepee uniforms were nearly identical to those of officers, except that the uniform rarely was worn in dress. Full dress uniforms also did not exist for Unteroffiziere, with the "lesser dress" typically the highest type of uniform that would be worn at the most formal of functions. The Unteroffiziere mit Portepee were known by the Feldwebel ranks (Portepeeunteroffiziere) but in both verbal and written correspondence were referred to by their rate. For instance, a pharmacist would be known as a Sanitätsfeldwebel while a senior machinist would be referred to as an Obermaschinist. For those with over ten to twelve years of service, the title Stabs would be added to their rate, i.e. Stabssteuermann or Stabsoberfunkmeister.

Uniform types

Standard uniforms

Dress uniforms
The Kriegsmarine full dress uniform (Grosse Uniform) was worn typically by officers ranked Korvettenkapitän and above. The uniform consisted of a double breasted midnight blue frock coat worn with a white swordbelt, full sized medals, sword, large epaulets, and a cocked hat (Zweispitz). There were two modifications to this uniform worn by all officer ranks: Grosser Gesellschaftsanzug which was an evening dress version of the uniform with bow tie, short open mess jacket, and a cummerbund. The Kleiner Gesellschaftsanzug was a "toned down" version of the dress uniform worn with a ribbon bar, dagger in place of full sword, a white service cap, and standard epaulets. A third category was the "walking out dress" (Ausgehanzug) which was essentially a standard service uniform worn with epaulets, belt, and sword or dagger.

Officer dress uniforms

Service uniforms
 
The Dienstanzug (Service uniform) was worn in headquarters settings and constituted (for officers) of a double breasted naval coat with sleeve stripes worn with ribbons, medals, badges, and a white dress belt. A raised collar white shirt with black neck-tie was worn underneath. The Kleiner Dienstanzug (lesser service uniform), allowed the officer to wear a normal collared shirt with a plain black tie. The lesser uniform was also typically worn without a full ribbon bar or belt, but still with highly notable awards such as the Knight's Cross, Iron Cross or German Cross. The officer uniform was colored midnight-blue and the double-breasted jacket had ten brass buttons and a matching peaked cap.

Officer service uniforms

Chief petty officers wore a uniform very similar to the officer jacket, but with shoulder epaulets instead of sleeve stripes to denote rank. The service uniform for an enlisted sailor consisted of a jacket, a pair of trousers, a white and a blue shirt, matching collars edged with three stripes, a silk neckerchief, grey gloves and a cap with two ribbons. The enlisted cap was emblazoned with the script "Kriegsmarine". The enlisted "dress service uniform" was worn with an open coat, buttoned in the center, with white dress shirt and embroidered gold sleeve buttons. The undress version consisted of a double breasted coat, worn over a dark shirt and black tie, with the coat displaying dark blue collar tabs.

Chief petty officer service uniforms

Sailor service uniforms

Service Duty uniforms
 
For standard everyday wear on-board naval vessels, enlisted sailors wore a frock coat with limited medals and badges (typically only war badges and high combat awards) as well as a simple system of collar tabs to denote between regular seaman and petty officers (Maat). In heavy weather, a thick overcoat was also worn.

The Kriegsmarine further maintained a summer uniform known as the Tropen- und Sommeranzug (Tropical and Summer Dress) designed for use in hot climates. The uniform classification was divided into tropical khakis, which the Monsoon Group wore this as their standard uniform while deployed to bases in Southeast Asia, and the "summer white variant" which consisted of a white service jacket for officers (with rank epaulets but no rank stripes), a similar white jacket with shoulder straps for chiefs, as well as a "pull over" white enlisted jumper for sailors and petty officers.

Kriegsmarine personnel permanently assigned to shore stations, to include coastal artillery, wore a grey green uniform in the same style as the German Army. The uniform was worn with closed collar with collar tabs and shoulder rank epaulets. Officers wore standard epaulets while chiefs wore shoulder straps with rank pips and a centered anchor crest. Enlisted seaman wore dark green chevrons and a bare shoulder strap while petty officers wore a rank strap similar to that of an army Unteroffizier.

Working sailor uniforms

Navy shore uniforms

Special uniforms

Special uniform variants included Kriegsmarine sportswear (Sportanzug) which consisted of running shorts with a white T-shirt, often worn with black shoes. Engineering personnel on-board surface ships were further issued with a boilersuit devoid of any insignia except for a swastika eagle emblem and worn with a blue garrison cap. A special variant, known as "sentry dress", was essentially a standard enlisted uniform worn with an ammunition belt while on armed sentry duty. Personnel assigned to deck guns or anti-aircraft crews also were issued flak helmets, sometimes with vests and flash hoods, depending upon the caliber of the manned guns.

Submarine uniforms

Due to the arduous nature of U-boat duty, uniforms varied greatly depending upon the actions and activity of the service member. All submarine personnel were required to maintain standard Navy uniforms, with the undress service uniform being the most commonly worn when on shore. Upon departure and return to base, especially when the submarine was visible to onlookers, officers would wear a modified version of the service uniform to consist of the blue service coat along with grey all weather over-trousers. Commanders who had earned the Knight's Cross would often wear tin copies for the ceremonial entrance and exit to port. All medals, ribbons, and badges were removed once fully underway at sea.

The standard "patrol uniform" consisted of a grey-brown denim jacket for officers and chiefs while a grey all weather smock coat was worn by enlisted personnel. Some of the original U-boat uniforms had been issued from British stocks abandoned at Dunkirk. U-boat personnel were also issued a variety of weather clothing to include fleece lined footwear and all weather over-trousers of brown or grey leather.

As an unwritten rule, the captain of any submarine wore a white peaked cap in contrast to officers and chiefs who wore blue service caps. Lookouts wore oilskins and sou'westers on duty while sailors in the control center and on deck were required to wear garrison covers. Dress restrictions for engineering and torpedo man personnel, who often worked in cramped and humid conditions, were far more lax and most in these duties wore comfortable civilian clothes. An unofficial modicum for the ship's Chief engineer was the "checkered shirt" which was a comfortable working shirt often worn with pants and suspenders.

Submarine duty uniforms

Rank insignia

Flag officer ranks

Officer ranks

Officer candidate ranks

Warrant officer and chief petty officer ranks
Within the rank group of Unteroffiziere mit Portepee there were two career paths; one leading to Warrant officer equivalent, and one leading to Chief petty officer equivalent. The first path was based on the Imperial Navy Deckoffiziere, Warrant officers, and lead straight from Petty officer, third class equivalent to Warrant officer equivalent. The second led from Petty officer, third class equivalent, to Petty officer, second class equivalent, to Petty officer, first class equivalent, and finally to Chief petty officer equivalent, for those allowed to remain in service after the end of the twelve years service obligation.

The generic rank title was Feldwebel, the specific rank titles for each branch is specified below.

Petty officer ranks

Petty officers also wore a large rating badge on their left sleeve, beneath which were displayed authorized trade badges. Shore uniforms were worn with a Germany Army style sergeant's shoulder boards and golden collar trim.

Seamen ranks

Enlisted sailors wore a rating badge above their rank chevrons while trade badges were displayed below. Enlisted chevrons on the shore uniform were gold colored with a dark green background. Unrated seamen were called Matrose. Rated seamen had a rank title depending on the rating. Rated deck branch seamen were called Matrosengefreiter. Rated carpenters were called Zimmermansgefreiter, rated Engine room seamen were called Maschinengefreiter etc.

Kriegsmarine rates

The Kriegsmarine rating system was designed to indicate the particular career specialty of enlisted sailors, petty officers, and chief petty officers. Officers did not use rates, but were divided between staff and line officers. Line officers wore a large gold star above their sleeve stripe insignia while staff officers wore a career specific emblem in place of the star.

The rating system had been developed during the 19th century by the Imperial German Navy and had carried over into the Reichsmarine and Kriegsmarine. German naval rates were differentiated between career fields in deck, engineering, weapons systems, medical rates, and technical specialties. The original rates of the Kriegsmarine, upon the service's creation from the Reichsmarine in 1935, were Boatswain, Sergeant, Signalman, Helmsman, Carpenter, Firework Maker, Gunner, Engineer, Musician, Machine Operator, and Radioman. By 1939, the rates of Sergeant and Firework Maker had been discontinued with several additional wartime rates added. By the end of the Second World War, there were nineteen established ratings in the German navy as well as a general "non-rated" category for unrated naval personnel.

A sailor enlisting into the German Navy was first simply designated as "unrated" and referred to as a Matrose. After basic training, the sailor would be assigned a rate; if simply completing a single enlistment with no promise or requirement for technical training, the sailor would be rated as a deck seaman and begin wearing a small gold star on their upper left shoulder. Once advanced to the "sailor corporal" ranks, the sailor would begin wearing a chevron underneath the rating star. When addressing the sailor verbally, their rate was not mentioned and the sailor typically referred to by the generic term Matrose or Matrosengefreiter. In written correspondence, the rate would sometimes be written after the rank, i.e. Matrose (Bootsmann) or Matrosenobergefreiter (Machinist).

Upon advancing to the rank of Petty Officer (Maat), a sailor would be referred to by their rate and rank (i.e. Steuermannmaat). Rank was denoted by a collar tab while rate was displayed as a larger patch replacing the former sailor sleeve chevron and rating badge. A special petty officer rating insignia existed for those Maat who were unrated; a rare occurrence but sometimes happening with those in highly specific career fields who had enlisted directly as a petty officer or who had never held an enlisted rate as a seaman.

Chief petty officers were addressed solely by their rate and wore rating insignia centered on their shoulder straps. The rating crest was the same used by seaman, except for the Bootsmann rate whose chiefs wore a fouled anchor in comparison to the rating star of the deck seaman. Unrated chief petty officers wore a standard anchor insignia on their shoulder boards and were referred to solely by their rank (Matrosenfeldwebel), often shortened to simply Feldwebel.

Trade badges

To denote additional qualifications within a particular rate, the Kriegsmarine issued a number of "trade badges" which were worn as red on blue patches beneath either the seaman's rank chevron or petty officer's badge. Trade badges were not worn or displayed by either officers or chiefs.

Qualification trade insignia was issued in up to four classes, beginning with a basic badge followed by apprentice, journeyman, and master. All trade badges above basic were denoted by chevrons on the trade patch; some trade patches were authorized up to all three chevrons while others were eligible for only one or two. One of the more common engineering trade badges was that of Handwerker (damage controlman) which appeared as a red diver's helmet and was issued up to the master qualification level.

A special insignia also existed for signalman who were posted to a naval headquarters. The insignia appeared as a small patch showing a German Imperial Navy signal flag and was worn above the sailor's signalman's rating badge.

Awards and decorations

Members of the Kriegsmarine were eligible for all Third Reich military awards as well as certain war badges and medals specific to the Kriegsmarine. The Knights Cross of the Iron Cross was a standard award for highly successful U-boat commanders. Political decorations were generally prohibited for display on military uniforms, with the exception of the Golden Party Badge. Kriegsmarine personnel could also earn both the SA Sports and German National Sports Badges as well as the Equestrian Badge.

Notes

References

Bibliography

 
 
 
 
 
 

German military uniforms
Kriegsmarine
Naval ranks of Germany